KITC-LP (106.5 FM, "Community Supported Radio") is a low-power radio station. Licensed to Gilchrist, Oregon, United States, the station is currently owned by Crescent/Gilchrist Community Action Team.

KITC operates a rotating wheel of formats depending on the day: traditional oldies on Sunday, contemporary country music on Monday, soft rock on Tuesday, 1970s classic hits on Wednesday, classic rock on Thursday, alt-country/Americana on Friday and 1980s classic hits on Saturday.

References

External links
 
 

ITC-LP
Oldies radio stations in the United States
ITC-LP
Klamath County, Oregon
Community radio stations in the United States